The cystatins are a family of cysteine protease inhibitors which share a sequence homology and a common tertiary structure of an alpha helix lying on top of an anti-parallel beta sheet. The family is subdivided as described below.

Cystatins show similarity to fetuins, kininogens, histidine-rich glycoproteins and cystatin-related proteins. 
Cystatins mainly inhibit peptidase enzymes (another term for proteases) belonging to peptidase families C1 (papain family) and C13 (legumain family). They are known to mis-fold to form amyloid deposits and are implicated in several diseases.

Types
The cystatin family includes:

 The Type 1 cystatins, which are intracellular and are present in the cytosol of many cell types, but can also appear in body fluids at significant concentrations. They are single-chain polypeptides of about 100 residues, which have neither disulfide bonds nor carbohydrate side-chains. Type 1 cystatins are also known as Stefins (after the Stefan Institute where they were first discovered )
 The Type 2 cystatins, which are mainly extracellular secreted polypeptides are largely acidic, contain four conserved cysteine residues known to form two disulfide bonds, may be glycosylated and/or phosphorylated. They are synthesised with a 19- to 28-residue signal peptide. They are broadly distributed and found in most body fluids.
 The Type 3 cystatins, which are multidomain proteins. The mammalian representatives of this group are the kininogens. There are three different kininogens in mammals: H- (high-molecular-mass) and L- (low-molecular-mass) kininogen, which are found in a number of species, and T-kininogen, which is found only in rats.
 Unclassified cystatins. These are cystatin-like proteins found in a range of organisms: plant phytocystatins, fetuin in mammals, insect cystatins, and a puff adder venom cystatin, which inhibits metalloproteases of the MEROPS peptidase family M12 (astacin/adamalysin). Also, a number of the cystatin-like proteins have been shown to be devoid of inhibitory activity.

Human cystatins
 CST1, CST2, CST3 (cystatin C, a marker of kidney function), CST4, CST5, CST6, CST7, CST8, CST9, CST11, CSTA (cystatin A), CSTB (cystatin B)

Plant cystatins
Plant cystatins have special characteristics which permit them to be classified in a special class called Phytocystatin. One is the presence of a N-terminal alpha-helix, present only in plant cystatins. Phytocystatins are involved in several process, including plant germination and defense. van Wyk et al. found some 19 different cystatins similar to oryzacystatin-I in the soybean along with related cysteine proteases.

Membrane permeability
Chicken cystatin quickly passed the membrane of MCF-10A neo T cells and inhibited cathepsin B when it was acylated with fatty acyl residues of 6-18 carbon atoms.

See also 
 Affimer, a type of engineered protein that is based on the cystatin scaffold

References

Further reading 
 Cystatin: a protein that flips out! Interesting PDB structure article at PDBe

External links 
 

Protease inhibitors